Kirkcaldy is a constituency of the Scottish Parliament (Holyrood). It elects one Member of the Scottish Parliament (MSP) by the plurality (first past the post) method of election. Also, it is one of nine constituencies in the Mid Scotland and Fife electoral region, which elects seven additional members, in addition to nine constituency MSPs, to produce a form of proportional representation for the region as a whole.

The seat has been held by David Torrance of the Scottish National Party since the 2011 Scottish Parliament election.

Electoral region 

The other eight constituencies of the Mid Scotland and Fife region are Clackmannanshire and Dunblane, Cowdenbeath, Dunfermline, Mid Fife and Glenrothes, North East Fife, Perthshire North, Perthshire South and Kinross-shire and Stirling.

The region covers all of the Clackmannanshire council area, all of the Fife council area, all of the Perth and Kinross council area and all of the Stirling council area.

Constituency boundaries and council area 

Fife is represented in the Scottish Parliament by five constituencies, Cowdenbeath, Dunfermline, Kirkcaldy, Mid Fife and Glenrothes and North East Fife.

The  constituency was created at the same time as the Scottish Parliament, in 1999, with the name and boundaries of a pre-existing Westminster (House of Commons) constituency. In 2005, however, Scottish Westminster constituencies were mostly replaced with new constituencies. The Kirkcaldy Westminster constituency was divided between Glenrothes and Kirkcaldy and Cowdenbeath.

In boundary changes that took effect at the 2011 Scottish Parliament election, the newly drawn Kirkcaldy was formed from the following electoral wards, all of which are part of Fife:

Burntisland, Kinghorn and Western Kirkcaldy
Buckhaven, Methil and Wemyss Villages
Kirkcaldy Central
Kirkcaldy East
Kirkcaldy North

Member of the Scottish Parliament

Election results

2020s

2010s

2000s

1990s

Footnotes

External links

Constituencies of the Scottish Parliament
Kirkcaldy
1999 establishments in Scotland
Constituencies established in 1999
Politics of Fife
Scottish Parliament constituencies and regions 1999–2011
Scottish Parliament constituencies and regions from 2011
Burntisland
Levenmouth
Kinghorn